Asian Highway 4 (AH4) is a route of the Asian Highway Network which runs  from Novosibirsk, Russia (on AH6) 
via Ürümqi, China (on AH5) to Karachi, Pakistan (on AH7).

Associated routes

Russia 
 : Novosibirsk (at AH6) - Biysk – Tashanta – border with Mongolia (972 km).

Mongolia 
 A0306 from the border with Russia near Ulaanbaishint to Ölgii (97 km)
 A0305 from Ölgii to Khovd (178 km)
 A0304 from Khovd to Mankhan (76 km)
 A14 from Mankhan to Bulgan (305 km)
 A14 from Bulgan to the border with China near Yarantai (47 km)

China 

 : Takeshkan to Fuyun, China (319 km)
 S11: Fuyun – Wucaiwan
: Wucaiwan - Ürümqi
 : Ürümqi-Toksun
 : Toksun-Kashgar
 : Kashgar - Tashkurgan - border to Pakistan (1948 km)
 The border is at  altitude, the Khunjerab Pass

Pakistan 
  Khunjerab Pass — Sust — Hasan Abdal
  Hasan Abdal — Islamabad
  Islamabad — Lahore
  Lahore — Multan — Sukkur — Karachi

See also
 Asian Highway 6
 Asian Highway 30
 Karakoram Highway
 List of Asian Highways

References

External links
Treaty on Asian Highways with routes

Asian Highway Network
Roads in Siberia
Roads in Pakistan
Roads in Mongolia
Roads in China